This is a list of the National Register of Historic Places listings in Lee County, Iowa.

This is intended to be a complete list of the properties and districts on the National Register of Historic Places in Lee County, Iowa, United States. Latitude and longitude coordinates are provided for many National Register properties and districts; these locations may be seen together in an online map.

There are 47 properties and districts listed on the National Register in the county, including 1 National Historic Landmark.

Current listings

|}

See also

 List of National Historic Landmarks in Iowa
 National Register of Historic Places listings in Iowa
 Listings in neighboring counties: Clark (MO), Des Moines, Hancock (IL), Henderson (IL), Henry, Van Buren

References

Lee